The Bulgarian Ice Hockey Federation is the governing body of ice hockey in Bulgaria.

National teams
  Bulgaria men's national ice hockey team
  Bulgaria men's national junior ice hockey team
  Bulgaria men's national under-18 ice hockey team
  Bulgaria women's national ice hockey team

References

External links
 Official website
 Bulgaria at IIHF.com

Ice hockey in Bulgaria
Ice hockey governing bodies in Europe
International Ice Hockey Federation members
Ice